Kancha Ilaiah Shepherd (born 5 October 1952) is an Indian political theorist, writer and a Dalit rights activist. He writes in both English and Telugu languages. His main domain of study and activism is the annihilation of caste.

Early life

Kancha Ilaiah was born in the village of Papaiahpet, Warangal district of Chennaraopet Mandal in Hyderabad, Telangana State. His family belonged to a community designated by the Government of India as an Other Backward Class. Ilaiah's father Kancha Komuraiah was always away from home while grazing sheep. The dominant figure in the family was his mother. Ilaiah credited his mother, Kancha Kattamma, as pivotal in shaping his political thought.

Ilaaih suffixed 'Shepherd' to his name symbolically, as he comes from a shepherding family.

Professional life
Ilaiah received an M.A. degree in political science and an M.Phil., awarded for his study of land reform in undivided Andhra Pradesh. He has been a recipient of the Mahatma Jyotirao Phule Award and was a Nehru Fellow between 1994 and 1997.

Ilaiah earned a Ph.D on the basis of his work exploring the political dimension of Buddhism, culminating in God as Political Philosopher - Buddha's Challenge to Brahminism.

Ilaiah has encouraged proficiency in the English language for Dalits, arguing that it would allow Dalits in India to intellectually engage the world outside India without non-Dalits speaking "for them". In May 2016, in protest against "Brahmanic hegemony" he says continues to persist in India, Ilaiah appended "Shepherd" to his name. Ilaiah identified in this choice recognition and reaffirmation of his family origins. As an English-language proper noun rather than its equivalent in an Indian language, "Shepherd" is meant to demonstrate a symbolic break with the cultural norms Ilaiah believed Brahmins sought to "impose" on Indian society. Ilaiah characterises his name change as a tool to break these norms and to value the work of what he terms "productive classes:" including Scheduled Castes and OBCs.

Kancha Ilaiah is an Ambedkarite. As an anti-caste activist, Ilaiah is often misidentified by the media as being a Dalit himself. Ilaiah identifies himself as a Sudra intellectual.

Criticism
While working as an associate professor in the Department of Political Science at Osmania University, several of Ilaiah's colleagues as well as academics affiliated with the university expressed, in an open-letter, their concern with respect to certain articles and opinions that Ilaiah had contributed to a local newspaper and advised him against writing material that could inflame sectarian discontent or prejudice.

In November 2015, Ilaiah stated that if Vallabhbhai Patel, the first Deputy Prime Minister of the Republic of India credited with forging national unity amidst the intense violence and bloodletting that followed the creation of Pakistan, had been Prime Minister of India, India "would have become Pakistan".

In April 2016, Ilaiah gave a controversial remark that vegetarianism is anti-nationalism. On 18 September 2017, T. G. Venkatesh, a member of Indian Parliament representing the Telugu Desam Party and a prominent leader of the Arya Vysya said at a press conference that Ilaiah was a traitor and should be hanged because his writings were "intended to divide society." Ilaiah alleged that the members of Arya Vysya community had tried to kill him and lodged a police complaint when Arya Vysya community members attacked his car in 2017.

In September 2017, Andhra Pradesh Chief Minister Chandrababu Naidu banned Ilaiah's book Vyshas for hurting the sentiments of another community after Vysyas community members protested and demanded a ban on the book.

Appointments
Among Ilaiah's official appointments have been:
Retired Director, Centre for Study of Social Exclusion and Inclusive Policy (CSSEIP) at Maulana Azad National Urdu University, Hyderabad
Former Head of department, Political Science, Osmania University, Hyderabad
Member of National Research Committee constituted by the Ministry of Social Justice, New Delhi
Member – Indian Council of Social Science Research (ICSSR), New Delhi
Former Member of the National Book Trust, Ministry of Human Resources Development, Government of India, New Delhi for three years
Member of the Planning Commission Sub Committee to formulate an agenda for land reforms for the XI Five Year Plan
Member of the UGC Constitutional Committee to oversee the implementation of OBC reservations in all Central and State universities in India
Former member of the Executive Council of Periyar Maniammai University (Tamil Nadu)

Selected publications

English language publications:
Ilaiah, K. Why I Am Not a Hindu: A Sudra critique of Hindutva philosophy, culture and political economy (Calcutta: Samya, 1996) 
Ilaiah, K. God as Political Philosopher: Buddha's Challenge to Brahminism (Calcutta: Samya, 2001) 
Ilaiah, K. Buffalo Nationalism: A Critique of Spiritual Fascism (Calcutta: Samya, 2004) 
Ilaiah, K., & Vyam, D. (2007). Turning the Pot, Tilling the Land: Dignity of Labour in Our Times. Pondicherry: Navayana Pub.  
Ilaiah, K. Post-Hindu India: A Discourse in Dalit-Bahujan Socio-Spiritual and Scientific Revolution (SAGE Publications Pvt. Ltd, 2009) 
Ilaiah, K.  Untouchable God: A Novel on Caste and Race (Kolkata: Samya, 2011)  
Ilaiah, K (1989-01-01). The State and Repressive Culture: The Andhra Experience. Hyderabad: Swecha Prachuranalu.  
Bonner, A., Ilaiah, K., Saha, S. K., Engineer, A. A., & Heuze, G. (1994). Democracy in India: A Hollow Shell. Washington D.C: The American University Press.  
Ilaiah, K; Nehru Memorial Museum and Library; Centre for Contemporary Studies (1995-01-01).  Caste or Class or Caste-class: A study in Dalitabhujan Consciousness and Struggles in Andhra Pradesh in 1980s. New Delhi: Centre for Contemporary Studies, Nehru Memorial Museum and Library 
Ilaiah, K., & Nehru Memorial Museum and Library. (1996). In Search of the Roots of Anti-Caste Struggle: A Dalitist Reading of the Buddhist Discourse. New Delhi: Centre for Contemporary Studies, Nehru Memorial Museum and Library. 
Ilaiah, K., & Nehru Memorial Museum and Library. (1997). Productive Labour, Consciousness and History: The Dalitabahujan Alternative. New Delhi: Centre for Contemporary Studies, Nehru Memorial Museum and Library. 
Ilaiah, K (1999-01-01). Reservations: Experience as Framework of Debate 
D'Souza, J., Ilaiah, K., Raj, U., & Dalit Freedom Network. (2004). Dalit Freedom: Now and Forever; The Epic Struggle for Dalit Forever. 
Nisar, M., Kandasamy, M., & Ilaiah, K. (2007).  Ayyankali: Dalit Leader of Organic Protest.  Calicut, Kerala: Other Books.  
Ilaiah, K (2010-01-01). The Weapon of the Other: Dalitbahujan Writings and the Remaking of Indian Nationalist Thought. Delhi: Longman.  

Telugu language publications:
ఐలయ్య, క. మన తత్వం: దళిత బహుజన తాత్వికత. హైదరాబాద్: హైదరాబాద్ బుక్ ట్రస్ట్

References

External links

Christianity Today interview with Ilaiah "Leading Dalit Rights Campaigner in India"
"One Man Takes Aim At Prejudice With Storybook" Washington Post feature on Ilaiah's children's book.
Ghadar interview "The State of Dalit Mobilization: An Interview with Kancha Ilaiah"
DNA India Interview with Ilaiah "Institutes like IITs and IIMs should be closed down"
Article by Ilaiah "Merit of Reservations"
Intellectuals Express Solidarity With Kancha Ilaiah

1952 births
20th-century Indian essayists
21st-century Indian essayists
Anti-Hindu sentiment
Indian civil rights activists
Dalit activists
Indian male essayists
Indian political scientists
Indian political writers
Indian socialists
Living people
People from Warangal
Writers from Hyderabad, India
English-language writers from India
Activists from Andhra Pradesh
Osmania University alumni